The 2009 European Parliament election in Slovenia was the election of the delegation from Slovenia to the European Parliament in 2009.

Candidates

Opinion polls

Results

References

Slovenia
European Parliament elections in Slovenia
2009 in Slovenia